Phyllocladus alpinus, the mountain toatoa or mountain celery pine, is a species of conifer in the family Podocarpaceae. It is found only in New Zealand. The form of this plant ranges from a shrub to a small tree of up to seven metres in height. This species is found in both the North and South Islands. An example occurrence of P. alpinus is within the understory of beech/podocarp forests in the north part of South Island, New Zealand.

The species contains the flavan-3-ols catechin, epicatechin and phylloflavan (ent-epicatechin-3-δ-(3,4-dihydroxyphenyl)-β-hydroxypentanoate).

Conservation status
In both 2009 and 2012 it was deemed to be "Not Threatened" under the New Zealand Threat Classification System, and this New Zealand classification was reaffirmed in 2018.

See also
 Archeria traversii

References

Further reading
 C. Michael Hogan. 2009. Crown Fern: Blechnum discolor, Globaltwitcher.com, ed. N. Stromberg

Podocarpaceae
Flora of New Zealand
Least concern plants
Taxa named by Joseph Dalton Hooker